Are You Smarter than a 5th Grader? is a game show franchise, that was co-created, and produced, by Mark Burnett, based on the game created by Howard Stern, for The Howard Stern Show. Adult contestants answer questions, as if they came from an elementary grade school quiz. The original U.S. version debuted on the Fox Broadcasting network on February 27, 2007, with host Jeff Foxworthy, airing on Fox until 2009, as a syndicated TV series, between 2009 and 2011, and then revived on Fox in 2015, and again on Nickelodeon in 2019, with new host, John Cena. The Are You Smarter than a 5th Grader? format, has since been replicated in several other countries, some versions under the same title, and some under modified ones.

In 2013, the show appeared, in TV Guides list of the 60 greatest game shows ever.

Gameplay

Each game is played by a single contestant, who earns money incrementally, based on a payout ladder, by answering simple trivia questions, with the game themed as a school quiz. The following description of the show, is based primarily on the U.S. version, of Are You Smarter than a 5th Grader?, though the general format applies to all international versions.

The game relies on the premise, that an adult would not know the information, generally, taught in elementary grade school, because it is rarely used in adult life, by the type of person chosen to be a contestant. Therefore, the show is essentially a test to see how much an adult has retained since graduating elementary school. The show also derives its humor by occasionally displaying the contestant's educational attainment, implying that in spite of that, they struggle to answer some questions.

The contestant is presented and chooses from a set of subjects and grade level question topics in any order they like, usually ten in most versions, with one or two subjects for each grade level. Each question is presented as either a multiple choice question of three answers, a true-or-false question, or a short-answered question, in which a contestant must answer it correctly in order to progress on to the next question. Throughout the game, the contestant can choose to "drop out of school" and leave with the current accumulated winnings won up to that point. If the contestant gets it incorrect, unless the student has the correct answer via a "Save" (see below), he or she "flunk out" and the contestant leaves the game either with nothing or the amount of money from the last threshold level they passed (in the Taiwanese version, the contestant's winnings are cut by half instead, as the version neither have a guaranteed sum not have an option to leave the game).

During the game, the contestant also chooses one of the five students from the classroom who will assist the contestant on two questions. The contestant is also presented with two "cheats" and a "save" that may only be used once throughout a game to help them on their way:
Peek: The contestant is shown their classmate's answer, and may use it or give a different one. When this cheat is used, the contestant may not "drop out" on the current question.
Copy: The contestant is locked into using their classmate's answer, without being able to see it first. The classmate must provide the correct answer in order for the contestant to advance to the next stage; otherwise, the contestant flunks out. When this cheat is used in the 2015 revival, the classmate is allowed to discuss his/her answer with the other fifth graders and change it if desired.
Save: If the contestant misses a question and the classmate has answered correctly, the contestant is credited with a correct answer and allowed to continue in the game. The contestant cannot choose to use the Save; it is automatically deployed on their first miss. If the classmate has also missed the question, the contestant flunks out. By using the Peek first, a contestant could have two possible answers to a question – their own, then the classmate's with the Save if needed.

Once all three forms of assistance are used or the tenth question is answered correctly, whichever comes first, the classmates must return to the tables and take no further active role in the game.

Each correct answer moves the contestant up a payout ladder (the question value determines the difficulty, regardless of grade level), and by completing the first set of ten questions the contestant is offered a final, bonus question worth the grand prize from the highest primary school grade level (for example, fifth-grade in the American version or sixth-grade in the 2015 revival). The subject is given to the contestant but not the question, then a decision must be made either by ending the game or risking their winnings and continue playing. Once the contestant decides to go on, the question is then presented and they must answer it. They can't "drop out" or receive any assistance from the classmates. A correct answer wins the contestant the grand prize that varies from country to country. At the end of the game, the contestant must confess to the camera whether they are "smarter than a 5th grader", based on whether they have won the grand prize.

Other formats
The American version also has two different variations of the game, each providing a different gameplay format from the original and offered a lower grand prize due to the variations' budgets.

Syndicated version
The syndicated version featured a reduced grand prize of $250,000 with a revised game format; unlike the original game format, the contestant must attempt to correctly answer up to ten questions with correct answers earning a certain cash value proportional to the difficulty (first-grade questions are worth the lowest amount, and fifth-grade being the highest). A correct answer earns the contestant the amount it's worth, while an incorrect answer takes their winnings back to zero. The contestant may not "drop out" until they get to the final question, where they choose to leave the game or risk all their winnings to answer one final fifth-grade bonus question; a correct answer multiplies their current winnings by ten while a miss forfeits all of their winnings and they leave instead with nothing or a $2,500 prepaid credit card if they took at least $2,500 to the final question. The cheats are retained from the original version and can still be used until the tenth question. A contestant must answer all eleven questions to win the $250,000.

When the syndicated version was revived for a second season, three changes were made. The main fifth-grade questions are removed, and the only one from that grade was the bonus question. Contestants must start at the first grade and cannot skip a grade. At least one question from each grade must be answered or have used a cheat on, 1 to 3, before they can roam the board freely. The "Save" has been removed.

Nickelodeon version
The 2019 Nickelodeon version also featured a different game format and a prize of up to $100,000. The format was split into two rounds: in round one, contestants answered six questions from the first four grades (one question from the first two grades, and two from the next two grades), with a possible maximum of $10,000. In round two, the contestant was given 60 seconds to correctly answer as many as five fifth-grade questions; each correct answers increase the multiplier by one; answering all five questions correctly for the round multiplies the round one winnings by ten.

The contestants are still given two cheats to use during the first round; the "Save" is instead replaced with a final cheat (usable on the second round) where the contestant may discuss with the classmate for the answer without a time limit.

International versions
The show has spawned many versions around the world:

 Currently airing
 No longer airing

Video game
On October 20, 2008, developer THQ released the first video game, titled Are You Smarter than a 5th Grader?: Make the Grade, for the PC, PS2, Nintendo DS, Wii, and Xbox Live Arcade. The Xbox Live Arcade version as of mid-2010 was delisted from the Xbox Live Game Marketplace.

A sequel Are You Smarter than a 5th Grader? Game Time was released on October 26, 2009, for Nintendo DS, Wii and Xbox 360.

Capcom Mobile released a game based on the game show for iOS devices called "Are You Smarter than a 5th Grader 2010" in 2009.

In 2012, Ludia released a free game based on the game show called "Are You Smarter than a 5th Grader? & Friends" for iOS devices.

In 2015, GameMill Entertainment released a game based on the 2015 FOX Primetime revival for the Nintendo 3DS.

A version for PC, PlayStation 4, Nintendo Switch, PlayStation 5, and Xbox Series X/Xbox One, developed and published by THQ Nordic subsidiaries Massive Miniteam and HandyGames, was listed on Steam and Amazon in 2022.

DVD game
Parker Brothers released a DVD game based on the show. Unlike the show, the player can only pick one classmate for the whole game and has a choice of 21 games. A 2-player mode is also available.

Video Slot Machine
In 2014, AGS (American Gaming Systems) released a slot machine game based on the show (along with Family Feud and Ripley's Believe It or Not!) as part of their "It Pays to Know" series of games. The base of the game is a five-reel scatter pay video slot on a four-by-five, yielding 1,024 possible winning combinations on every spin. packed with bonus event like: "Free Spin Events", "Picking Bonuses" & "Mystery Awards". In the game, players are prompted to choose one of the four "Helpers" fall-backs like eliminating one of the four possible multiple-choice answers or its stats on how the audience would answer the question. The layer is then given a first-grade question and then tries to answer it correctly. The earlier the correct answer is picked, the higher the award. Answering a question correctly within three times advance the grade level and the game goes on. Completing the "Gold Star Bonus" in which the player picks from a field of five stars to reveal an advance award. In addition to the "Helper" picked at the beginning, the player can earn any of the three "cheats" by landing symbols on the primary game:

 Peek – Just like the TV show, this help lets you look at the answers of a "classmate". You can then choose to "copy" the answer for the game while the other cheat is "Save" for which it automatically corrects your wrong answer if the classmate has the correct one.
 Field Trip – In this bonus events, the picks are made to reveal multipliers for a free-spin bonus and two primary game events called "Mystery Jackpot" and "Mega Block Spins" where it expands the real field for up to 10 rows of symbols with three wild reels for one super spin.
Additional Note – In the "Peek" bonus event, the classmate will not always have the right answer.

Notes

See also
Gatekeepers (game show) – A 2010 Singaporean game show with gameplay format borrowed from Are You Smarter than a 5th Grader?, but was not part of the Are You Smarter than a 5th Grader? franchise

References

External links
 Official site

 
Television series about children
Television series created by Mark Burnett